David Murmanovich Khmelidze (born 28 April 1979) is a former Georgian professional footballer. He also holds Russian citizenship.

Club career
He made his professional debut in the Russian Third League in 1997 for FC Zhemchuzhina-d Sochi. He played 1 game in the 2000 UEFA Intertoto Cup for FC Rostselmash Rostov-on-Don.

References

1979 births
Sportspeople from Sochi
Living people
Footballers from Georgia (country)
Georgia (country) international footballers
Expatriate footballers from Georgia (country)
Russian Premier League players
FC Rostov players
FC Zhemchuzhina Sochi players
Russian people of Georgian descent
FC Gornyak Uchaly players
Expatriate footballers in Russia
Expatriate footballers in Belarus
FC SKVICH Minsk players
FC Zvezda Irkutsk players
Association football goalkeepers
FC Spartak Nizhny Novgorod players